"Somebody's Crying" is a song by American musician Chris Isaak from his fifth album, Forever Blue. The song was released as the album's first single on May 15, 1995, reaching number 45 on the US Billboard Hot 100 and becoming a top-five hit in Australia and Canada. It also appears on his 2006 Best of Chris Isaak compilation. A live version is included on Isaak's 2008 Live in Australia album.

Inspiration and lyrics
Isaak wrote the song shortly after a breakup with his girlfriend. Isaak had attended a friend's party, but soon realized that he did not want to be there. He went inside a walk-in closet, closed the door, grabbed a guitar that was leaning against the back wall, and wrote "Somebody's Crying."

Lyrically, the song describes one's yearning for a former lover, and the fear of communicating again with that person. In a 1995 interview, Isaak compared the lyrics to a way children often speak:

Release and reception

"Somebody's Crying" peaked at number 45 on the US Billboard Hot 100 in August 1995, making it Isaak's second-highest-charting single after "Wicked Game", which reached number six in 1991. "Somebody's Crying" also peaked at number 27 on the Hot AC chart, number 34 on the Modern Rock Tracks chart, and number 36 on the Top 40 Mainstream chart. Elsewhere, the song peaked at number five in Australia and number 22 in New Zealand, marking Isaak's highest chart placement in the former country. It charted the highest in Canada, climbing to number four on the RPM Top Singles chart. However, the single was not as commercially successful in the United Kingdom, reaching number 81 on its chart.

The song received a 1996 Grammy Award nomination for Best Male Rock Vocal Performance, but again lost to Tom Petty's "You Don't Know How It Feels."

Music video
The music video for "Somebody's Crying" was released in 1995 and was directed by Bill Pope. In contrast to the song's melancholy lyrical content, the video presents a more upbeat story of a summer romance, and features Isaak riding a surfboard, a favorite pastime of his. Isaak said, "I thought it would be more fun to do. More and more I'm trying to keep a little bit of fun in what I'm doing." Actors Jennifer Rubin, Jenna Elfman, Zen Gesner, and Chris Penn appear in the video.

The video received a 1995 MTV Video Music Award nomination for Best Male Video, but lost to Tom Petty's "You Don't Know How It Feels."

Track listings
CD and cassette (US, UK, Australia, Germany)
 "Somebody's Crying"
 "Changed Your Mind"

CD maxi-single (Australia, Germany)
 "Somebody's Crying" (album version) - 2:46
 "Change Your Mind" (album version) - 3:50
 "The Little White Cloud That Cried" (written by Johnnie Ray) - 2:19

Charts

Weekly charts

Year-end charts

Release history

In popular culture
The song was played during parts of two episodes of the Fox television series Party of Five in 1995. It was also featured in a 1995 episode of MTV's Beavis and Butt-head. An acoustic performance of the song by Isaak is included in the 2000 DVD compilation, MTV Unplugged: Ballads.

References

1995 singles
1995 songs
Chris Isaak songs
Reprise Records singles
Song recordings produced by Erik Jacobsen
Songs written by Chris Isaak